The 1977 Hardy Cup was the 1977 edition of the Canadian intermediate senior ice hockey championship.

Final
Best of 5
Campbellton 4 Warroad 3
Campbellton 5 Warroad 3
Warroad 7 Campbellton 2
Campbellton 6 Warroad 3
Campbellton Tigers beat Warroad Lakers 3-1 on series.

External links
Hockey Canada

Hardy Cup
Hardy